The International Publishers Association (IPA) is an international publishing industry federation of national publisher associations representing book and journal publishing, founded in 1896 in Paris. It is a non-profit and non-governmental organization, to promote and protect publishing and to raise awareness for publishing in the context of economic, cultural and political development. The IPA actively opposes censorship and promotes copyright, literacy and the freedom to publish, and represents the interests of the publishing industry on an international level.

History 

Founded in 1896 in Paris, France by the leading publishers at that time the initial aim of the IPA was to ensure that countries throughout the world adopted copyright law and implemented the then new international copyright treaty, the 1886 Berne Convention for the Protection of Literary and Artistic Works.

The IPA, active mostly in Europe during its first century, provided a platform for national publishers to voice their concerns for future important issues. From its first year, IPA members called to countries to eliminate custom duties to intellectual products, and the tenth Congress in 1933 dealt for the first time with book fairs.

In 1962, the IPA’s headquarters moved from Zurich to Geneva.

Objectives
One of IPA's main objectives is the promotion of copyright. Since its establishment the IPA also promotes and defends the freedom to publish, which it describes as a "fundamental aspect of the human right to freedom of expression. As an industry association IPA continues to deal with a range of issues affecting publishers, such as book fairs, standards, piracy, literacy, textbook procurement policy, collective licensing, VAT, professional training, and promotion of reading. The IPA also functions as a meeting place for publishers to network and conduct business.

Freedom to Publish 
One of the IPA's main goals is to protect the right of publishers to produce and distribute the materials they choose to, in other words, to protect their basic human right to freedom of expression. The IPA bases its beliefs on the following human rights standards:
Article 19 of the Universal Declaration of Human Rights
Article 19 of the International Covenant on Civil and Political Rights
Article 10 of the European Convention for the Protection of Human Rights and Fundamental Freedoms

In 2004, the IPA began working with International Freedom of Expression Exchange (IFEX). IFEX was established in 1992 to combat all the offenses that were taking place against freedom of expression. It has 81 member organizations and monitors and reports violations using an Action Alert Network (AAN). This network allows members throughout the world to campaign against violations using tools such as letter writing campaigns, media coverage, and awareness-raising events. Many of the organizations' actions are focused on freeing imprisoned journalists and keeping journalists around the world safe.
The IPA website offers links to many websites dealing with the freedom to publish, such as AAP International's Freedom to Publish Committee, Amnesty International, etc.

Prohibition of Religious Defamation 
In 2008 the IPA adopted a resolution against prohibiting religious defamation, in light of the UN Ad Hoc Committee session on complementary Standards called at the initiative of the Organization of the Islamic Conference (OIC). In 2009 the forum passed a resolution condemning religious defamation as a human rights violation, also noting that “Islam is frequently and wrongly associated with human rights violation and terrorism.” In a 2010 Press Release, the IPA stated that “Human Rights protect individual human beings, not institutions or religions. Criticism of religions and religious practices must be allowed, in
particular when religions are viewed from a political point of view. As organizations representing writers, artists and journalists of all faiths and none, we warn against any regulations prohibiting criticism of any religion or any set of ideas.”

Copyright and Google Books Project 
In 2005 IPA issued a joint statement with PEN USA on the Google Books Project. The statement raised concerns, that Google is disregarding the rights of authors and is infringing copyright law. In the statement the two organizations asserts the rights of an author to determine whether their work will be available in a digital format. The statement raises the concern that once materials are available digitally it is hard to monitor how many copies are produced, which is an infringement of copyright legislation. The IPA and PEN USA call for Google to obtain author permission before making works available in the Google Print Library Project. They also wish for Google to work more closely with authors to make sure that authors’ rights are not violated.

World Intellectual Property Organization

World Blind Union 
The IPA collaborates closely with the World Blind Union (WBU) and other interests of persons with print disabilities. Since 2009, WBU among other related organizations have discussed in the World Intellectual Property Organization (WIPO) Stakeholder Platform to discuss without the interference of international organization politics. Since March 2011 the collaboration in this forum is suspended.

Folklore Protection 
Protecting traditional knowledge and expression of folklore may be a concern for publishers who publish fairy tales and traditional stories, school books with reference to local customs or related scientific journal articles. There have been several international efforts for special protection of traditional folklore, notably by WIPO and UNESCO. IPA participates in discussions through WIPO’s program for traditional cultural expressions. IPA tries to make sure the rights of freedom of expression and publisher’s positive impact relating to such cultural material are not threatened.

Industry Policy: Value Added Tax 
The IPA advocates for favorable indirect tax systems such as Value Added Tax (VAT) on publications of all formats. IPA considers books should be “zero-rated.” Such policies have been already implemented in the UK, Norway, Korea, Mexico, Thailand. In its 2010 Global Survey for VAT/GST/Sales tax rates for books and electronic publications, 15 countries have exemptions for all books, 33 have reduced rates for all books, 26 have reduced or exemption for books with limitations, and 13 have no reductions that apply.

International Standards 
As an international federation, one of the activities of the IPA is to facilitate the setting of international standards in publishing. One of the most famous and most used international standards are ISBN and ISSN a unique multi-digit identifier for individual books and periodicals, respectively (both print and electronic) IPA is an observer to the International ISBN Agency Board and has the right to attend all board meetings to represent the publishing industry's interests. Other assisting organizations in the ISBN Agency include the International Organization for Standardization (ISO), and the International Federation of Library Associations (IFLA). IPA maintains liaison relationships with the ISO team working on information resources. Other systems the IPA supports through creator organizations are the Automated Content Access Protocol (ACAP) and ONIX. It is a charter member of EDItEUR, an international organization coordinating standard setting for electronic publications,

Educational Publishing 
The IPA created the International Educational Publishers Forum to support a sustainable educational publishing industry. Digital Migration of educational material, a topic associated with curriculum change, new technologies, and piracy prevention, has been a recent issue in this forum. The forum’s main aim is to voice effectively the benefits of an innovative, diverse and high quality publishing industry in open markets.

Free Book Circulation 
Part of the IPA’s mission is to distribute free literary materials to those in need. To fulfill this mission the IPA maintains working relations with UNESCO. The IPA supports the Florence Agreement on the Importation of Educational, Scientific and Cultural Materials (1950) and the Nairobi Protocol (1976). These international treaties allow for the free circulation of educational, scientific, and cultural materials without customs fees. One hundred countries around the world have ratified the Florence Agreement. The IPA also helped establish UNESCO’s World Book and Copyright Day. The purpose of this day is to promote reading, publishing and the protection of intellectual property through copyright.

World Book Capital Cities 
IPA proposed the idea of nominating one city a year as a World Book Capital, under which cities must promote books and foster books through various events, while conforming to the principles of freedom of expression, freedom to publish and to disseminate information. The title enables the promotion and communication of the winning city and is also a symbolic achievement. A nominating committee (formed of IPA, IFLA, IBF and UNESCO) decides on the city each year. Following Madrid, Alexandria, and New Delhi, the capitals are as follows: 2004: Antwerp (Belgium); 2005: Montreal (Canada); 2006: Turin (Italy); 2007: Bogotá (Colombia); 2008: Amsterdam (The Netherlands); 2009: Beirut (Lebanon); 2010: Ljubljana (Slovenia); 2011: Buenos Aires (Argentina); 2012: Yerevan (Armenia).

Organization

Membership 
The IPA is a federation of national, regional and specialist publishers' associations. The IPA has more than 60 organizational members from more than 50 countries in Africa, Asia, Australia, Europe and the Americas. It has consultative status as non-governmental organization at the United Nations.

Committees 
 Copyright Committee
 Freedom to Publish Committee
 Literacy & Book Industry Policy Committee
 International Education Publishers Forum

Governing Bodies 
The governing body is the General Assembly. The assembly is composed of two representatives of the publishers association from each country; each is allowed a vote in assembly decisions. The assembly meets at least once a year, usually at the Frankfurt Book Fair.

The President is elected by the General Assembly with a term of two years. He or she is the head of the General Assembly and the Executive Committee. The Executive committee formulates plans and policies for the General Assembly to discuss and vote on. The IPA also elects two Vice Presidents and regional representatives. A Secretary General acts as the chief operating officer.

The President until 2023 is Bodour Al Qasimi. The Secretary General is José Borghino.

List of IPA Presidents 
President biographies from 1896 were assembled at the 125th anniversary.
 1962–1966: Santiago Salvat Espasa
 1980–1984: Manuel Salvat Dalmau
 1988–1992: Andrew Neilly
 1992–1996: Fernando Guedes
 1996–2000: Alan Gründ
 2000–2004: Pere Vicens
 2004–2008: Ana Maria Cabanellas, first female IPA President in 108 year-history
 2009–2010: Herman P. Spruijt
 2011–2014: Youngsuk “Y.S.” Chi
 2015–2017: Richard Charkin
 2017–2019: Michiel Kolman
 2019–2021: Hugo Setzer (Manual Moderno, Spain)
 2021–2023: Bodour Al Qasimi second female IPA President in 129 year-history

Meetings

Congress 
IPA organizes a Publishers Congress every four years, starting from 1896 in Paris, France, where publishers fully and openly discuss relevant, basic, and long-term industry problems and challenges.

In 2008, the 28th IPA Publishers Congress in Seoul, Korea attracted nearly 700 participants from over 45 countries. In its resolution, the Congress expressed the need for reform in the freedom to publish in Burma/Myanmar, China, Iran, and Vietnam, calling for the immediate release of publishers, writers, journalists and bloggers in prison or under house arrest for having exercised their rights to freedom of expression.

Copyright Symposiums 
The IPA hosts a Copyright Symposium every four years. The first Copyright Symposium was held in 1986, Heidelberg, Germany, to mark the centenary of the Berne Convention for the Protection of Literary and Artistic Works. The Copyright Symposia are held in partnership with IPA member organization.

From 28 February to 1 March 2010, Abu Dhabi hosted the 7th Copyright Symposium, held for the first time in the Arab world. Attended by 270 delegates from 53 countries, the two-day symposium was attended by government officials, legal experts, publishers and authors. Plenary speeches and seminars covered topics such as copyright and Islamic law, publishing in the internet age, collective licensing, the digital market place, global copyright trends and the future of copyright in emerging markets. The symposium was held immediately before the Abu Dhabi International Book Fair, 2 to 7 March.

IPA Prix Voltaire 
Since 2005, the IPA has been awarding the annual IPA Prix Voltaire known until 2016 as the "IPA Freedom to Publish Prize", to honour a person or an organization anywhere in the world that has defended and promoted the freedom publish with courage. It consists of a monetary award and a certificate. The list of past winners is as follows:
 2020 Liberal Publishing House, Vietnam
 2019 Khaled Lotfy, Egypt
 2018 Gui Minhai, Sweden/Hong Kong
 2017 Turhan Günay and Evrensel, Turkey
 2016 Raif Badawi, Saudi Arabia
 2014 , Belarus
 2012 Jonathan "Zapiro" Shapiro, South Africa
 2011 Bui Chat, Giay Vun Publishing, Vietnam He was arrested by Vietnam authorities shortly after his return from Buenos Aires, where he received his prize. Though temporarily released in May, he is still subject to surveillance and further interrogation.
 2010  and Viktor Kogan-Yasny, Chechnya, Russia
 2010 Freedom to Publish Prize Special Award to Irfan Sanci, Sel Yayıncilik, Turkey 
 2009 Sihem Bensedrine, Neziha Rjiba and Mohamed Talbi, OLPEC, Tunisia 
 2008 Ragıp Zarakolu, Belge, Turkey
 2007 Trevor Ncube, Zimbabwe 
 2007 Freedom to Publish Prize Special Award to Anna Politkovskaya, Russia and Hrant Dink, Turkey   
 2006 Shalah Lahiji Roshangaran, Iran

Associated organizations 
IPA has official consultative status with United Nations organizations such as the World Intellectual Property Organization (WIPO), the United Nations Educational, Scientific and Cultural Organization (UNESCO) and the Universal Postal Union (UPU), World Trade Organization (WTO), International Telecommunication Union (ITU), Organisation for Economic Co-operation and Development (OECD). Recently, IPA has participated in the WIPO Stakeholder Platform, an initiative to explore the specific needs and concerns of copyright owners and reading-impaired persons.

IPA also has regular connections with industry and regulatory organizations. These include national publisher associations, organizations representing special consumer interests, and reproduction rights organizations which essentially collect license fees for rights holders. For example, IPA is an associate member of the International Federation for Reproduction Rights Organizations (IFRRO) and since 2004, represents publisher interests on the IFRRO Board. It is also a member of International Standard organizations EDItEUR and International ISBN Agency.

References

External links 
 

Publishing-related professional associations
International trade associations